François Langers (29 December 1896 – 4 October 1929) was a Luxembourgian footballer. He competed at the 1920 Summer Olympics and the 1924 Summer Olympics.

References

External links
 

1896 births
1929 deaths
Luxembourgian footballers
Luxembourg international footballers
Olympic footballers of Luxembourg
Footballers at the 1920 Summer Olympics
Footballers at the 1924 Summer Olympics
Sportspeople from Esch-sur-Alzette
Association football forwards